During the 1995–96 English football season, Peterborough United F.C. competed in the Football League Second Division.

Season summary
A poor start to the season that saw Peterborough win 3 out of the first 13 games forced manager John Still to leave the club in October 1995 to be replaced by Mick Halsall. They show signs of improvement between mid-February and mid-March which saw them win 5 out of the last 8 games climbing them to mid-table but as it seemed Peterborough were going to make a late charge for a play-off place, poor form returned, winning just 1 out of final 12 games picking up just 7 points during that run which saw them slump to a disappointing 19th place just 3 points clear of the relegation zone.

Final league table

Results
Peterborough United's score comes first

Legend

Football League Second Division

FA Cup

League Cup

Football League Trophy

Southern Section

Squad

Peterborough United F.C. seasons
Peterborough United